Haloferax larsenii is a gram-negative, aerobic, neutrophilic, extremely halophilic archaeon. It was named in honor of Professor Helge Larsen, who pioneered research on halophiles.

Discovery
Haloferax larsenii was isolated from a solar saltern in the Zhoushan archipelago, Zhejiang Province, China. The researchers who discovered this species isolated three strains of H. larsenii. When this species was discovered, the genus Haloferax comprised Haloferax volcanii, H. mediterranei, H. denitrificans, H. gibbonsii, H. alexandrinus, H. lucentense, and H. sulfurifontis. Since this time, H. prahovense, H. elongans, and H. mucosum have been discovered, which totals to 11 species in the genus.

Diversity
Like most species in Haloferax, H. larsenii was isolated from an extremely salty environment consisting of a mixture of mud and brine.

Phylogenetic position
The species has been placed in a phylogeny:

Characteristics 

Cells of H. larsenii are extremely pleomorphic and irregularly shaped with a diameter of 0.8-1.5 µm. Motility of cells has been noted, but flagella have not been observed by electron microscopy. The major polar lipids are the C20C20 derivatives of phosphatidylglycerol, phosphatidylglycerol phosphate methyl ester, diglycosyl glycerol diether, and sulfated diglycosyl diether. The DNA G+C content of DNA of the ZJ206T strain is 62.2±0.8 mol% as determined by thermal denaturation.

When grown on complex agar medium, colonies appeared orange-red, smooth, circular, elevated, and 1–2 mm in diameter. Colonies can grow with NaCl concentrations of 1.0-4.8 M, with optimum growth between 2.2 and 3.4 M. However, saturated NaCl inhibits growth in liquid medium. The optimum pH for growth is 6.5-7.0 and the optimum temperature for growth is 42-45 °C.
Anaerobic growth occurs on nitrate with the production of gas; nitrate is reduced to nitrite.

Glucose, glycerol, mannose, starch, maltose, sucrose, glutamate, alanine, ornithine, fumarate, malate, pyruvate, succinate, and lactate substrates support growth. Growth is not sustained on arabinose, lactose, mannitol, rhamnose, sorbitol, galactose, ribose, xylose, arginine, lysine, aspartate, glycine, acetate, propionate, and citrate.

Sensitivity to novobiocin, bacitracin, anisomycin, aphidicolin, and rifampicin have been observed. However, no sensitivity has been shown to ampicillin, penicillin, chloramphenicol, erythromycin, neomycin, nalidixic acid, nystatin, tetracycline, streptomycin, or kanamycin.

Furthermore, H. larsenii was shown to form indole, hydrolyze gelatin, starch, and Tweens 40 and 80; produce acid from glycerol, maltose, glucose, fructose, and sucrose; and form H2S from thiosulfate.

References

External links
Type strain of Haloferax larsenii at BacDive -  the Bacterial Diversity Metadatabase

Halobacteria
Archaea described in 2007